Czatkowy  is a village in the administrative district of Gmina Tczew, within Tczew County, Pomeranian Voivodeship, in northern Poland. It is located within the ethnocultural region of Kociewie in the historic region of Pomerania.

The Czatkowy Lake is located in the village.

The village has a population of 372.

Czatkowy was a private church village of the monastery in Pelplin, administratively located in the Tczew County in the Pomeranian Voivodeship of the Polish Crown.

Notable people
  (1925–1992), Polish lawyer and professor of the University of Gdańsk, participant of the Polish Warsaw Uprising during the German occupation of Poland (World War II)

References

Populated places on the Vistula
Villages in Tczew County
Pomeranian Voivodeship (1919–1939)